Michael Shawn Kerzner  is a Canadian politician who was elected to the Legislative Assembly of Ontario in the 2022 provincial election. He represents the riding of York Centre as a member of the Progressive Conservative Party of Ontario.

Kerzner took over from independent MPP Roman Baber who was expelled from the PC caucus on January 15, 2021, for his COVID-19 lockdown stances. It was expected that Baber would run against Kerzner but Baber instead opted to run in the 2022 Conservative Party of Canada leadership race.

On June 24, 2022, Kerzner was named Solicitor General of Ontario by Premier Doug Ford.

References 

Living people
Progressive Conservative Party of Ontario MPPs
Politicians from Toronto
Jewish Canadian politicians
21st-century Canadian politicians
Year of birth missing (living people)
Solicitors general of Canadian provinces